Esma Redžepova-Teodosievska (8 August 1943 – 11 December 2016) was a Macedonian Romani vocalist, songwriter and humanitarian. Because of her prolific repertoire, which included hundreds of songs, and because of her contribution to Romani culture and its promotion, she was nicknamed the Queen of the Gypsies.

She started to sing while she was a teenager in the 1950s, and her career spans over five decades. Her musical success was closely linked to her marriage with Stevo Teodosievski, who was a composer, arranger and director of a musical ensemble Ansambl Teodosievski. He wrote many of her songs and fully managed her career until his death in 1997. Her musical style was mostly inspired by traditional Romani and Macedonian music. Some other influences are also noticeable, such as pop music. Esma Redžepova started her career at a period when Romani music was very denigrated in Yugoslavia and Romani people considered it shameful for women to sing in public. Redžepova was one of the first singers to sing in Romani language on radio and television.

Redžepova was particularly noted for her powerful and emotional voice. In 2010, she was cited among the 50 Great Voices in the world by NPR. Redžepova was also noted for her extravagant attires and her turbans, as well as the use she made of typical stereotypes about Romani women, such as sensuality and happiness. In 2010, she was awarded the Macedonian Order of Merit; and in 2013, she was named National Artist of the Republic of Macedonia by President of Macedonia Gjorge Ivanov.

With her husband Stevo Teodosievski, she fostered 47 children and received numerous accolades for her humanitarian work. She supported Roma and women rights and was also involved in local politics in her hometown of Skopje.

Together with Vlatko Lozanoski, she represented Macedonia in the Eurovision Song Contest 2013 in Malmö, Sweden. Initially, they were supposed to sing the song "Imperija"; however, that song caused controversy, so a new song, "Pred da se razdeni", was chosen, with which they participated in Sweden. They participated in the second semi-final of the competition on 16 May 2013, placing 16th in the field of 17 songs, scoring 28 points and thus failing to qualify to the final on 18 May.

She died on 11 December 2016 after a short illness.

Early life and background
Redžepova was born on 8 August 1943 in Skopje, at that time annexed by the Kingdom of Bulgaria, although the region was returned to Yugoslavia in 1944. She was the second youngest of six children in a Romani family. Her paternal grandfather was a Catholic Romani and her grandmother an Iraqi Jew, while her mother was a Muslim Romani from Šuto Orizari.
While other sources said she was born in Toopana in a poor Xoraxane Muslim Roma Family

Her father Ibrahim, who had lost a leg during a German bombing in Skopje in 1941, worked variously as a porter, circus strongman and shoeshiner. He sang and played drums and sometimes performed at weddings. Some of Redžepova's siblings accompanied him. Her mother was a seamstress.

At age nine, Redžepova was introduced by one of her brothers to a local Romani music organisation where she was able to quickly learn complicated rhythms. Her mother encouraged her musical gifts so Redžepova and her brother soon joined their school's folklore group. Her parents insisted that all their children finish primary school. However, they had very traditional views and expected Esma to get married in her teens and become a housewife. Nonetheless, their daughter was emancipated and would wear fashionable dresses instead of dimije, the traditional attire for Romani girls at that time.

Music career

Debut

In 1956, Redžepova's headteacher suggested she sing at a school talent contest for Radio Skopje. She went without informing her parents, who did not want her following the path of her older sister who started singing in cafes at age 17. Among Romani people, such a career was viewed as inappropriate or shameful for an unmarried girl.

Redžepova performed "A bre babi sokerdžan", a Macedonian Romani traditional song. It was the first time a song in Romani was aired by the station. Redžepova won the contest, beating 57 other schools and winning 9,000 dinars. When Redžepova's parents learned about her success, they were upset and reluctant to let her follow a musical career. At that time, the only employment prospects for Romani singers were performing in cafes and restaurants.

Stevo Teodosievski, an ethnic Macedonian musician and band frontman, was impressed by Redžepova's performance at the contest and hoped she might join his musical ensemble. Teodosievski was a self-taught man coming from a poor background, leading the large folk musical troupe Ansambl Teodosievski. He also worked for Radio Skopje and was a member of the League of Communists of Macedonia.

As part of the local establishment, Teodosievski was somewhat of a visionary in holding the belief that Romani music could one day become esteemed and popular among non-Romani people. At that time, Romani music in Yugoslavia was disparaged and not considered suitable for radio or television. Furthermore, racism against Romani people was common in Macedonia and throughout Yugoslavia, and even Romani people themselves had a low opinion of Romani singers – especially female ones. Before Redžepova, Romani performers rarely sang in Romani on radio or television and hid their origins. Teodosievski had been promoting Romani music even before meeting Redžepova and faced harsh criticism in the media for it. However, he felt Redžepova could help him achieve his goals and perhaps even become one of the most prominent artists in the country. He convinced Redžepova's parents to let her go with him and join his ensemble.

When they met in Skopje, Teodosievski was not fully satisfied with Redžepova's voice. He encouraged her to train for long hours and enroll at the Academy of Music in Belgrade, where she studied for two years.

Yugoslav years
After Redžepova left the Academy of Music in Belgrade, Serbia, she joined the Ansambl Teodosievski and started touring. In 1961, the Ansambl went to Zagreb, Croatia, to record Redžepova's first record. It was released by Jugoton and included "A bre babi" as well as "Chaje Shukarije", a song Redžepova wrote herself. The song, sung in Romani, quickly became a huge success in Yugoslavia.

The 1960s and 1970s were extremely successful for the couple. They recorded many albums and EPs, and took part in radio and television shows. Most of the songs performed by Redžepova at that time were traditional Romani songs or songs inspired by Romani music. However, some of them had a noticeable Western influence. "Makedo" is inspired by cha-cha-chá, "Kod Kodak" shows heavy pop influences, and "Pesma Šeher Sarajevu" makes use of psychedelic organs. Redžepova also performed many songs related to ethnic Macedonian music with no tie to Romani music. Some of these songs are duets recorded with Macedonian singers, such as "Blagujno Dejče", "Biljana platno beleše" and "Zošto si me majko rodila".

In Josip Broz Tito's Yugoslavia, Romani people were officially recognised as a national minority and were granted linguistic and cultural rights. However, Redžepova was one of a handful of Romani artists in Yugoslavia to have achieved widespread and lasting success and public acclaim, together with Serbian Romani vocalist Šaban Bajramović.

Despite her success, Redžepova was the target of racism and gossip. Romani people in Skopje thought of her as dishonorable for the community and were very critical about her relationship with Teodosievski, a "gadjo". At that time, it was unthinkable for Macedonians and Roma to engage in mixed marriages, and both communities strongly disapproved them. Redžepova was frowned upon by Roma because she had an emancipated lifestyle, performing on stage, sleeping in hotels, working with men. On the other side, institutions, including Radio Skopje and the League of Communists of Macedonia, were very critical about Teodosievski and reproached him for working with "Gypsies". To escape the stifling atmosphere, Redžepova and Teodosievski moved to Belgrade, the capital of Yugoslavia, at the beginning of the 1960s. They married in 1968.

Racist prejudice played a large part in Redžepova's career. Media often characterized her with traits considered typical to Roma people: she was portrayed as hot blooded, happy and easy going, and genetically talented. Comments were often made about her dark skin. Teodosievski used some positive stereotypes to promote the singer, as long as they gave a tasteful image of her.

At the end of the 1960s, Redžepova and Teodosievski founded a music school where they mostly trained young disadvantaged boys, usually Romani. Most of the musicians in Ansambl Teodosievski were trained in the school and some of them eventually achieved fame. In total, 48 boys attended that school.

By encouraging other Macedonian Romani musicians, Redžepova and Teodosievski built a circle around them. Among the most prominent members were the singers Muharem Serbezovski, Usnija Redžepova and Enver Rasimov, and clarinetist Medo Čun.

Yugoslavia was part of the Non-Aligned Movement and the Yugoslav artistic scene was subject to many international influences. Redžepova performed several songs in foreign languages, such as Greek, Turkish, Hebrew and Hindi. The Romani people came from India to Europe in the Middle Ages. The link that Tito created with Jawaharlal Nehru and India was very important for Yugoslav Gypsies because their culture and history were publicly enhanced. Redžepova and Teodosievski visited India three times, in 1969, 1976 and 1983. During their second trip, they have entitled the King and the Queen of Romani Music at the first Romani Music Festival in Chandigarh. In 1983, Redžepova sang in front of Indira Gandhi.

In addition to performing for Indira Gandhi, Redžepova also sang for Josip Broz Tito, Reza Pahlavi and Muammar Gaddafi. Together with her husband's ensemble, she performed for public audiences in several countries, including the United States, the Soviet Union, Mexico, Australia and Canada. In 1962, she was the first Yugoslav artist to perform at the Olympia in Paris.

Career after the independence of Macedonia
During the 1980s, Redžepova's career had reached its peak. In 1989, she settled in Skopje with her husband. After independence in 1991, the Republic of Macedonia went through difficult times. Stevo Teodosievski died in 1997 at 72. She toured the United States the year after, performing at a series of benefit concerts. She also released a selection of duets with Usnija Redžepova in 1994.

The 2000s were very fruitful and marked a slight shift in the singer's career. In Macedonia and former Yugoslavia, she gained a more modern image and redefined herself as a worldbeat artist. For instance, she made several collaborations with young pop singers. In 2002, she recorded a song with the Croatian band Magazin and a duet with the Macedonian singer Toše Proeski. She also recorded a song with the Bosnian band Crno Vino in 2005, and made a collaboration with Kiril Džajkovski in 2010. On the international scene, she contributed towards the establishment of Romani music as a non-mass-market good, pleasing an urban and cultural elite. However, many of her new songs were not widely accepted by Western audiences because they did not match their expectations about Romani music. For instance, some songs featured the synthesizer, an instrument that is not used in traditional Roma music. She was booed at a concert in Spain, but defended herself saying that Romani music has always adapted itself and borrowed external features.

Her best known single, "Chaje Shukarije", is the feature song on the 2006 Borat movie soundtrack, which she claims was used without her permission. Together with Naat Veliov from Kočani Orkestar she sued the producers of the film for €800,000 ($1,000,000). Afterwards, Redžepova won a €26,000 compensation, since it turned out that Sacha Baron Cohen got permission from her production house to take the song, which she was not notified about. She was particularly upset because her song was used to illustrate backwardness, something she always fought against. However, Borat contributed towards the expansion of her fame internationally.

She was selected together with Vlatko Lozanoski to represent Macedonia in the Eurovision Song Contest 2013. Their song, "Imperija", was unveiled in March 2013, but it caused controversy in the country as its clip featured many monuments of the controversial project Skopje 2014. The song was thus viewed as a nationalist act. Macedonian Radio Television requested that the singers write a new song. Eventually, "Pred da se razdeni" was released a month later. The song failed to advance from the second semi-final of the competition on 16 May 2013, placing 16th in the field of 17 songs, scoring 28 points.

Death

Redžepova died on the morning of 11 December 2016 in Skopje after an illness, she was 73. She had previously been taken to hospital on 28 November, and was then in a critical condition. Her funeral ceremony took place on 12 December at the Skopje City Council, where several officials, including the Mayor of Skopje and the President of Macedonia, Gjorge Ivanov, paid homage to her. She was later buried at Butel cemetery.

Film career
In addition to numerous video clips, Esma Redžepova appeared in several films, both fictional and documentary. She made her debut as an actress in Krst Rakoc, a Yugoslav film released in 1962 and featuring Bata Živojinović in the main role. She recorded four songs included in the soundtrack. In 1968, she appeared as a singer in Zapej Makedonijo, a film for which she also recorded songs.

In the 2000s, Redžepova resumed her film career. She appeared in four documentary films during the decade, starting with the German Im Herzen des Lichts – Die Nacht der Primadonnen in 2002. It was followed by When the Road Bends… Tales of a Gypsy Caravan in 2006, a documentary about five Romani music acts on their tour through the United States. She was, however, very unhappy about this film and the image it gives about her community. She thought the audience would imagine that all Romani people live in squalid conditions, ignoring that there are middle-class Roma, just like herself. The film Rromani Soul, released the year after and directed by Louis Mouchet, features Esma as the guide of the true origin of Romani people located in Kannauj, Uttar Pradesh by Romani linguist Marcel Courthiade. In 2009, she appeared in a second German documentary film, Balkan Soul & Gypsy Blues.

Artistry

Repertoire
Esma Redžepova recorded and released more than 580 songs, including two platinum and eight gold discs. She performed more than 22,000 concerts, a third of which were held for charities. With Ansambl Teodosievski, she recorded 108 singles, 32 compact cassettes, 15 discs, six videotapes and numerous television shows.

Redžepova mostly sang in Romani and Macedonian, but she also recorded songs in Serbo-Croatian, Turkish, Hebrew, Greek and Hindi. Redžepova's songs often spoke about love, sorrow and marriage. One of her most famous songs called "Chaje Shukarije" became an anthem for all Roma all over the world.

Esma often sang traditional songs, both Romani and Macedonian, but a lot of them are also compositions. Teodosievski usually composed and arranged songs, but Esma composed some tracks as well, including "Chaje Shukarije". She also choreographed performances.

Musical style and inspirations
Ansambl Teodosievski, which Esma Redžepova performed the most with, is composed of traditional instruments, used both by Roma and Macedonians, such as the oboe, accordion, zurna and davul. Most of Esma's songs were either in the line of Roma or Macedonian folk tradition, with various influences ranging from Turkish, Middle Eastern to Central European. However, contemporary influences are visible on her later work, which can be characterised as worldbeat influenced pop music. During the 2000s, as she started recording duets with younger artists, she contributed to pop, ethno-pop and RnB songs. Furthermore, some of her earlier songs also showed strong Western influences, including "Kod, kodak" (1966), "Devojka i pesna" (1966), "Makedo" (1966), "Pjesma Šeher Sarajevu" (1970) and "Đurđevdan, Đurđevdan" (1972).

Redžepova's voice greatly changed over the years. When she started singing, her voice was bright and almost childlike. Stevo Teodosievski compared it to the sound of a silver bell.

Esma Redžepova defended that Romani music was inventive, evolving and subject to many influences. However, she was very critical of hybrid Romani music such as the ones from Spain and Hungary. She stated that Romani musicians from these countries play more or less local non-Romani music. She considered her singing style very ancient and traditional.

Esma Redžepova did not cite any inspirational artists and stated that she owed everything to her husband. Her favorite artists were the Bulgarian Nedyalka Keranova and the Iranian Googoosh. She also enjoyed classical music and cited Luciano Pavarotti as one of her favourite classical artists.

Videos and stage

On stage and in her music videos, Esma Redžepova played with stereotypes linked to Gypsy women and used traditional attire and dancers. The Middle-Eastern character of her performances was often enhanced to please non-Romani audiences. In the same way, costumes worn by Esma or her dancers could be inaccurate to Macedonian Romani culture. For instance, some videos showed Hungarian or Russian costumes, to match the expectations of the non-Roma about Romani culture and traditional dresses. Although Esma used sensuality and seduction in many of her early songs, such as her numerous čočeks, she limited this aspect of her performance by not wearing immodest belly dance outfits. Instead, she usually wore the Romani dimije, which she personalized by using modern fabrics.

Her performances could be very theatrical depending on the song and the emotion that grew from it. For instance, when singing "Hajri Ma Te Dike", Redžepova usually wore a black veil and pretended to be weeping.

Because she extensively worked with the same music ensemble, Redžepova had a particular relationship with her musicians. On stage, they stood and took part in the choreography and mime interactions with the singer in accordance with the text of the songs. In the early performances, musicians swayed left and right to the rhythm with their instruments, as did Western pop groups of that period.

Museum of Music
When Esma Redžepova settled back in Skopje with her husband in 1989, she started to work on an ambitious project: a Museum of Music and House of Humanity. The couple imagined it as a place to keep an archive of Romani music, and musical and historical artifacts, with a performance room, a studio and a place where poor people could get medical treatment.

The couple bought a plot close to the Contemporary Art Museum of Macedonia and the Skopje Fortress. Construction started in 1992. The building served as Redžepova's house and was to become a museum after her death.

Humanitarian and political engagement
Esma Redžepova's first humanitarian engagement was fostering 47 deprived children during the 1970s and 1980s. She also sponsored thousands of benefit concerts for various causes: hospitals, orphanages, disaster victims, etc. She was an honorary president of the Macedonian Red Cross, in recognition of her extensive work with Romani refugees from Kosovo. However, it was not until 2002 that she sponsored a benefit concert dedicated explicitly to the Romani people. Esma Redžepova was also a member of the Lions Club.

In general, she tended to favour large and inclusive causes, rather than only defending her community. This was mainly due to her strong attachment to the Republic of Macedonia. She was in fact a national icon, popular among all ethnic groups and she often showed strong patriotism. She was officially considered as a cultural ambassador and she was granted a diplomatic passport in 2007. She defended the policies on Romani people implemented by successive Macedonian governments and she asserted that it was the best country for Romani people, as they enjoyed much more rights and freedom than anywhere else. In general, she advocated larger cross-cultural understanding and pacifism. She also defended women's rights and their access to power, both on political and economic levels. In 1995, she sponsored a Romani women organisation from Skopje, which subsequently chose to be called "Esma".

Esma Redžepova became politically engaged in the 1990s, when she was close to the Romani leader Amdi Bajram and to Vasil Tupurkovski, founder of the Democratic Alternative. This centrist party was short-lived, and Esma became a member of the right-wing VMRO-DPMNE, which came into power in 2006. In 2009, Esma was elected as a member of the City Council of Skopje, and was reelected in 2013.

Redžepova's ties with the VMRO-DPMNE were criticised several times in Macedonia, for instance in 2010, when she was granted €25,000 for her museum by the City Council of Skopje. The municipal opposition, led by the SDSM, was hostile to the donation because the museum was not officially registered as such, and the building served at that time as Redžepova's house and hosted a local VMRO-DPMNE office. When she was awarded the title of the National Artist in 2013, the opposition again denounced the fact that she was also granted a national pension. Finally, the same year, when she rehearsed the Macedonian entry for Eurovision, the song, "Imperija", caused controversy because it appeared to be a promotion of the Skopje 2014 urbanism project, led by the VMRO-DPMNE.

Personal life
Esma Redžepova married her manager, Stevo Teodosievski, in 1968. Born in 1924, he was 19 years older than her. He died in 1997. They never had children of their own but fostered 47 abandoned or deprived children. They raised 5 of them under their roof and ensured a home and education for the others.

Esma Redžepova was known for her unique sense of fashion. She often wore heavy jewels and colourful turbans. She had a collection of over 300 turbans.

Awards and recognition
 1976 – Queen of World Gipsy music
 1992 – 13 November Award of Skopje
 1995 – Award prima donna of European singing
 2005 – Norwegian Academy of Literature and Freedom of Expression
 2010 – Order of Merit for Macedonia
 2013 – National Artist of Macedonia

Discography 

 Songs of a Macedonian Gypsy, World Connection, 1998
 Romske pesme, PGP-RTS, 2000
 Mon histoire, My story, Accords croisés, 2007

Filmography 
 Krst Rakoc (1962)
 Zapej Makedonijo (1968)
 Jugovizija (1971)
 Im Herzen des Lichts – Die Nacht der Primadonnen (2002)
 When the Road Bends… Tales of a Gypsy Caravan (2006)
 Rromani Soul (2008)

See also
 Music of North Macedonia
 Romani music

References

External links

Official website
Redzepova Discography on Monitor Records at Smithsonian Folkways

1943 births
2016 deaths
20th-century Macedonian women singers
Macedonian people of Jewish descent
Macedonian Romani people
Musicians from Skopje
Macedonian folk-pop singers
Macedonian folk singers
Eurovision Song Contest entrants of 2013
Eurovision Song Contest entrants for North Macedonia
Yugoslav women singers
Romani singers
Macedonian humanists
People of Iraqi-Jewish descent
Romani-language singers